Bilenke is a village (a selo) in the Zaporizhzhia Raion (district) of Zaporizhzhia Oblast in southern Ukraine. Its population was 4,976 in the 2001 Ukrainian Census. Bilenke is the administrative center of the Bilenke Rural Council, a local government area.

See also
 Bilenke Pershe

References

Populated places established in 1770
1770 establishments in the Russian Empire
Yekaterinoslav Governorate
Populated places on the Dnieper in Ukraine

Zaporizhzhia Raion
Villages in Zaporizhzhia Raion